Soviet Jazz Themes (full title: The Victor Feldman All Stars Play the 'World's First Album of Soviet Jazz Themes) is an album by vibraphonist and pianist Victor Feldman featuring tunes by three composers he discovered while on Benny Goodman's 1962 tour of Russia which he recorded on returning to the U.S. and released on the Äva label.

Track listing 
 "Ritual" (Andre Towmosian) – 5:01
 "Blue Church Blues" (Gennadi Golstain) – 7:07
 "Madrigal" (Golstain) – 6:21
 "Vic" (Givi Gachechiladze) – 4:50
 "Polyushko Polye" (Golstain) – 3:52
 "Gennadi" (Golstain) – 5:15
Recorded at United Recording Studios, Hollywood, CA on October 26, 1962 (tracks 1–3) and November 12, 1962 (tracks 4–6)

Personnel 
Victor Feldman – vibraphone, piano
Nat Adderley – cornet (tracks 1–3)
Carmell Jones – trumpet (tracks 4–6)
Harold Land – tenor saxophone
Joe Zawinul – piano (tracks 1–3)
Herb Ellis – guitar (tracks 4–6)
Bob Whitlock – bass
Frank Butler – drums

References 

Äva Records albums
Victor Feldman albums
1963 albums
Albums recorded at United Western Recorders